Roderick Chalmers "Roddy" Lumsden (28 May 1966 – 10 January 2020) was a Scottish poet. He was born in St Andrews and educated at Madras College. He published seven collections of poetry, a number of chapbooks and a collection of trivia, as well as editing a generational anthology of British and Irish poets of the 1990s and 2000s, Identity Parade, among other anthologies.

Background
He lived in London where he taught for The Poetry School and independently. He did editing work on several prize-winning poetry collections and the Pilot series of chapbooks by poets under 30 for Tall Lighthouse. He was organiser and host of the monthly reading series BroadCast in London. Between 2010 and 2015, he was Poetry Editor for Salt Publishing, responsible for commissioning over thirty individual collections, and for whom he was also Series Editor of The Best British Poetry anthologies.

Lumsden was a Vice Chairman of The Poetry Society. He was awarded an Arts Council of England International Fellowship at the Banff Centre in Ontario in 2001 and also carried out several residency projects, including being poet-in-residence to the music industry and in a five-star hotel and golf resort. He also worked as a puzzle and quiz writer and a popular reference compiler and editor. In 2014 he became a regular team member on Radio 4's long running show Round Britain Quiz, representing Scotland alongside crime writer Val McDermid. They won the 2014 series.

Lumsden received an Eric Gregory Award in 1991. His first book Yeah Yeah Yeah was shortlisted for the Forward Prize in the Best First Collection section. His second collection The Book of Love was a Poetry Book Society Choice and shortlisted for the T.S. Eliot Prize and The John Llewellyn Rhys Prize. Roddy Lumsden is Dead followed in 2001, then Mischief Night: New & Selected Poems which was a PBS Recommendation and, in 2009, then Third Wish Wasted, poems from which were awarded the Bess Hokin Prize by the Poetry Foundation. A sixth collection, Terrific Melancholy, was issued in 2011, followed by Not All Honey in 2014 and Melt and Solve in 2015. So Glad I’m Me in 2017 was shortlisted for the T. S. Eliot Prize.

Lumsden was diagnosed with acute liver cirrhosis in 2016. He moved into a care home in New Cross, London, close to where he lived for many years in Blackheath, and died in early 2020.

Published works

Poetry collections
Yeah Yeah Yeah (Bloodaxe, 1997)
The Book of Love (Bloodaxe, 2000)
Roddy Lumsden is Dead (Wrecking Ball Press, 2001)
Mischief Night: New & Selected Poems (Bloodaxe, 2004)
Third Wish Wasted (Bloodaxe, 2009)
Terrific Melancholy (Bloodaxe, 2011)
Not All Honey (Bloodaxe, 2014)
Melt and Solve (Salt Publishing, 2015)
So Glad I’m Me (Bloodaxe, 2017)

Pamphlets
Elsewhere Perhaps Later (privately published, 1995)
The Bubble Bride (St Andrews Bay, 2003)
Super Try Again (Donut Press, 2007)
The Bells of Hope (Penned in the Margins, 2012)

As editor
The Message (Poetry Society, 1999, co-ed with Stephen Trousse)
Anvil New Poets 3 (Anvil Press, 2001, co-ed with Hamish Ironside)
Identity Parade: New British & Irish Poets (Bloodaxe, 2010)
The Best British Poetry 2011 (Salt, 2011)
The Salt Book of Younger Poets (Salt, 2011, with Eloise Stonborough)

Other
Vitamin Q: a temple of trivia lists and curious words (Chambers, 2004)
Every Boy's Book of Knowledge (Prion, 2007, compiler and editor)
Chambers Gigglossary (Chambers, 2008, contributor)

References

External links 
Roddy Lumsden profile at Poetry Foundation
Detailed obituary at The Scotsman

Scottish poets
1966 births
2020 deaths
People educated at Madras College